Kid Cudi is an American actor, producer, film composer, music video director and musician. Cudi ventured into acting in 2009, when he was cast in the HBO series How to Make It in America. In 2011, Cudi, alongside fellow American rapper Cage, starred in Maniac, a short horror film directed by American actor Shia LaBeouf. Cudi went on to appear in several feature films, including Goodbye World (2013), Need for Speed (2014), Entourage (2015), Bill & Ted Face the Music (2020), and X (2022). In addition, he has made appearances on television shows such as One Tree Hill, The Cleveland Show, Brooklyn Nine-Nine, and Westworld. In 2015, he was the bandleader on the IFC series Comedy Bang! Bang! and in 2020 starred in the television drama We Are Who We Are.

In 2020, Cudi launched production company Mad Solar. The company will produce a film adaptation of the coming-of-age campus novel Real Life, with Cudi set to star. Mad Solar also produced Cudi's Netflix animated special Entergalactic, which Cudi co-created alongside fellow actor Kenya Barris. In 2021, Cudi was credited as an executive producer on the award-winning film Malcolm & Marie. In March 2022, Cudi revealed he would be making his feature directorial debut with the Netflix film, Teddy, a project he’s also written and in which he’ll star. Cudi announced the news in a social media post, noting that he’d been working on the project since 2013. Musicians Jay-Z and Jeymes Samuel serve as executives on the film, which was also produced by Bron Studios and Cudi's Mad Solar banner.

Film

Television

Celebrity/musical guest

Music videos

As lead artist

As featured artist

Cameo appearances

See also 
 Kid Cudi's acting career
 Kid Cudi discography

References

External links 
 
 

Male actor filmographies
American filmographies
Videographies of American artists
Filmography